Hamish McDouall is a New Zealand local government politician and a former mayor of Whanganui. He is a member of the New Zealand Labour Party.

Biography

Early life and career
McDouall was born in Wanganui to Shirley (née Sanson) and Gerald McDouall and attended Wanganui Collegiate School. He studied law and arts at the University of Otago. McDouall was a winner on the gameshow Sale of the Century and was the champion of TVNZ's Mastermind programme in 1990, collectively winning nearly $100,000 worth in prizes. His winning specialist subject was The Life & Works of David Bowie. He played both soccer, cricket and represented Whanganui in roller hockey.

He then lived abroad in England, Sweden and Russia before returning to Wanganui in 2001. He then took up work as a barrister and solicitor and worked in corporate, family, and community law. He is the author of four published books.

Political career
McDouall joined the Labour Party in 2007 and was Labour's candidate for the Whanganui electorate in 2008, 2011 and 2014, but lost to incumbent Chester Borrows.

At the 2010 local body elections he was elected a member of the Whanganui District Council. After serving one term as deputy mayor to Annette Main, McDouall succeeded the Whanganui mayoralty in the 2016 local government elections. After winning the 2016 election with 39.18% of the popular vote and 2,900 more votes than that of his nearest rival, McDouall was returned to the mayoralty in 2019 unopposed. Mcdouall lost the 2022 mayoral to first time candidate Andrew Tripe.

Personal life
He has a wife, Elinor, and two children. He is a second cousin of Prime Minister Jacinda Ardern.

References

1960s births
Living people
New Zealand Labour Party politicians
Mayors of Wanganui
Deputy mayors of places in New Zealand
Unsuccessful candidates in the 2008 New Zealand general election
Unsuccessful candidates in the 2011 New Zealand general election
Unsuccessful candidates in the 2014 New Zealand general election
People educated at Whanganui Collegiate School
Contestants on New Zealand game shows
Jacinda Ardern